Mahl or MAHL may refer to:    

 Mahls, the third subgroup of the Dhivehi people native to Minicoy Island, India
 Mahl dialect, of the Dhivehi language spoken on Minicoy Island, India
 Mahl writing systems, for the Mahl dialect of the Maldivian language
 Mahl (town), Andhra Pradesh, India
 Mahl (surname), a surname
 Mahl, Texas, an unincorporated community in Nacogdoches County
 Mahl-i-zan, a village in Valdian Rural District, Ivughli District, Khoy County, West Azerbaijan Province, Iran
 Mid-Atlantic Hockey League, a minor professional hockey league in USA
 Mahl Aynin ( – 1910), Saharan Moorish religious and political leader

See also
 Mahlstick or maulstick, a stick with a soft leather or padded head used by painters to support the hand holding the paintbrush
 Nathan Mahl, a Canadian progressive rock band formed in 1981
 

Language and nationality disambiguation pages